Battle of Pyzdry may refer to:

 Battle of Pyzdry (1331)
 Battle of Pyzdry (1863)